The Crimean People's Republic or Crimean Democratic Republic was a self-declared state that existed from December 1917 to January 1918 in the Crimean Peninsula. The Republic was one of many short-lived states that declared independence following the 1917 Russian Revolution caused the collapse of the Russian Empire. The Crimean People's Republic was the first Turkic and Muslim democratic republic in the world.

Brief history

Establishment
The Crimean People's Republic was declared by the initiative of the Kurultai of Crimean Tatars, which stipulated the equality of all ethnicities within the peninsula; the largest proportion of people living in the Crimea at the time were Russian (then comprising 42% of the population of the Crimea) or Ukrainian (11%). However, Crimean Tatars were for a while the dominant political and cultural force on the peninsula. Noman Çelebicihan was chosen as the first President of the nascent Republic.

The Kurultai consisted of 76 delegates, four of whom were female (Şefika Gasprinskaya, Anife Bоdaninskaya, Ilhan Tohtar, Hatice Avcı). The delegates were chosen from five counties: Yalta (24), Akmescit (19), Kefe (16), Kezlev (11), and Orkapy (6). Asan Sabri Ayvazov, long-time Crimean independence leader, journalist, and educator, was elected Chairman of the Kurultai.

The Kurultai, in opposition to the Bolsheviks, published a "Crimean Tatar Basic Law", which convened an All-Crimean Constitutional Assembly, established a Board of Directors as a provisional government, and erected a Council of National Representatives as a provisional parliament. The Board of Directors and the Central Council of Ukraine both mutually recognized each other.

Bolshevik coup d'état
This attempt to build a new nation was quickly defeated by the Bolshevik- and anarchist-dominated Black Sea Fleet. Already on 16 December 1917, the Bolsheviks captured Sevastopol where the headquarters of the Black Sea Fleet was located and dissolved the local council of deputies. The power in the city was transferred to the local revkom. The Bolsheviks were supported by some ships of the Black Sea Fleet. To defend itself, the Crimean government created a United Crimean Headquarters on 19 December 1917, that had at its disposal two cavalry and one infantry regiment of Crimean Tatars as well as some Ukrainian and Russian formations that amounted to some thousand people. Several armed incidents took place during January 1918. On 14 January 1918, the Bolsheviks captured Simferopol where they managed to arrest former President of Crimea (Head of Directorate) Noman Çelebicihan who had just resigned on 4 January 1918. He was transferred back to Sevastopol and interned until 23 February 1918, when he was executed without trial. The body of Çelebicihan was thrown into the sea.

On the initiative of Çelebicihan on 10 January 1918, the Kurultai created a special commission that conducted talks with the Bolsheviks to stop the armed conflict in Crimea.

By the end of January 1918, the Bolsheviks had captured the whole of Crimea and dissolved both the Kurultai as well as the Council of National Representatives. The Red Terror engulfed the peninsula. With Çelebicihan in the Reds' custody, another leader of the Crimean Tatars, Cafer Seydamet Qırımer, managed to escape to the Caucasus across continental Ukraine. Many Crimean military formations retreated to the mountains. The government of Ukraine blockaded Crimea while trying to re-establish control over the Black Sea Fleet and the city of Sevastopol. Any Muslim supporting military formations on the way to Crimea was stopped. That, in turn, triggered a protest from the All-Russian Muslim military council. By the end of January 1918, the Ukrainian government itself was forced to declare war on the Russian SFSR due to the advancement of the Red Guard forces of Moscow and Petrograd into Ukraine without explicit notification.

The Bolsheviks briefly established the Taurida Soviet Socialist Republic on Crimean territory in early 1918 before the area was overrun by forces of the Ukrainian People's Republic and the German Empire. Some officials of the national government, such as Seydamet Qırımer who managed to escape the Bolsheviks' terror sought political asylum in Kyiv and petitioned for military help from the advancing Ukrainian Army as well as the forces of the Central Powers.

Government
On 28 December the Kurultai had established a republican government (Hükümet).
 Minister of Justice - Noman Çelebicihan (chairman)
 Minister of Defense - Cafer Seydamet Qırımer (also Minister of Foreign Affairs)
 Minister of Education - Amet Özenbaşlı
 Minister of Finance - Seyitcelil Hattat (also Minister of Foundation)
 Minister of Religion - Ahmet Şükrü

See also
 Russian Civil War
 Ukrainian–Soviet War

Notes

References

External links
 Ivanets, A. Ukrainian-Crimean-tatar union of the Revolutionary times. Ukrayinska Pravda. 2012-08-02. (original source)

 
Russian Revolution in Ukraine
History of Crimea
Politics of Crimea
Post–Russian Empire states
Aftermath of World War I in Ukraine
Politics of the Crimean Tatars
Former republics
1917 establishments in Ukraine
1918 disestablishments in Ukraine
States and territories established in 1917
States and territories disestablished in 1918
Political history of Crimea
Crimea during the Russian Civil War
Tatar nationalism